Manes are the souls of deceased loved ones in Roman mythology.

Manes may refer to:
 Manes (band), a band from Trondheim, Norway
 Manes of Lydia, a king of Maeonia (later called Lydia)
 Mani (prophet) or Manes, founder of Manichaeism
 Manes, Missouri
 Manes River, a river of Greece
 Alaverdi or Manes, Armenia
 Manvo or Manes, Armenia
 Manes, a slave of Diogenes of Sinope
 Manes, a character in The Birds by Aristophanes

People  with the name
 Manes (surname)
 Manès Sperber (1905-1984), Polish Jewish writer
 Joseph Manes Österreicher (1759-1831), Hungarian physician

See also 
 Mánes Union of Fine Arts, a Czech arts organization
 Mannes, a surname
 Mane (disambiguation)
 Mani (disambiguation)
 Manassas (disambiguation)
 Manasses (disambiguation)